Eucnemesaurus (meaning "good tibia lizard", for its robust tibiae) is a basal sauropodomorph dinosaur genus usually considered to be a synonym of Euskelosaurus. Recent study by Yates (2006), however, indicates that it is valid and the same animal as putative "giant herrerasaurid" Aliwalia.

Eucnemesaurus was named in 1920 by Egbert Cornelis Nicolaas van Hoepen. The type species is Eucnemesaurus fortis. The specific name means "strong" in Latin. It is based on holotype TrM 119, a partial skeleton including vertebrae, part of a pubis, a femur, and two tibiae.  The remains were found by Van Hoepen in the late Carnian-early Norian-age Upper Triassic Lower Elliot Formation of the Slabberts district, Orange Free State, South Africa.
Yates assigned the genus to the new family Riojasauridae, with Riojasaurus, usually regarded as a melanorosaurid.

Aliwalia
Fossil material now assigned to Eucnemesaurus was once placed in a separate genus and species, Aliwalia rex (the generic name was taken from the Aliwal Park Reserve in the Union of South Africa, where the first remains were found). The fossil evidence of this species was comparably small, with for many years only femoral fragments and a maxilla known, having been sent from South Africa to Austria in 1873 in a shipment with prosauropod bones.

The size of the femur led many palaeontologists to believe (along with the clearly carnivorous maxilla), that Aliwalia was a carnivorous dinosaur of remarkable size for the age in which lived. It would have been comparable to that of the large Jurassic and Cretaceous theropods, such as Allosaurus, that evolved tens of millions of years after Aliwalia. The original material was believed to bear a strong similarity to the South American Herrerasaurus, so much so that Aliwalia was originally classified in Herrerasauridae by Peter Galton.

However, later re-evaluation of the material has shown that the maxilla assigned to Aliwalia does not, unlike the other material, belong to Eucnemesaurus, as it is clearly from a carnivore. In addition, new material clearly demonstrates this latter genus' sauropodomorph affinities.

Sources
E. C. N. van Hoepen (1920). "Contributions to the knowledge of the reptiles of the Karroo Formation. 6. Further dinosaurian material in the Transvaal Museum", Annals of the Transvaal Museum 7(2): 93-141
 Yates, A.M. (2006). "Solving a dinosaurian puzzle: the identity of Aliwalia rex Galton". Historical Biology, 1–31

References

Sauropodomorphs
Carnian genera
Norian genera
Late Triassic dinosaurs of Africa
Triassic South Africa
Fossils of South Africa
Fossil taxa described in 1920
Taxa named by Egbert Cornelis Nicolaas van Hoepen